The Kowan languages are a small family of languages spoken in the Adelbert Range area of Madang Province, Papua New Guinea, and first identified by Malcolm Ross.

The languages are Waskia, with 20,000 speakers, and Korak, with 500.

Further reading
Ross, Malcolm. 2014. Proto-Korak-Waskia. TransNewGuinea.org.

References

 
Languages of Madang Province
Isumrud languages